7088 Ishtar, provisional designation , is a synchronous binary asteroid and near-Earth object from the Amor group, approximately  in diameter. It was discovered on 1 January 1992, by American astronomer Carolyn Shoemaker at the Palomar Observatory in California. The relatively bright asteroid with an unknown spectral type has a rotation period of 2.7 hours. In December 2005, a 330-meter sized satellite was discovered, orbiting its primary every 20.65 hours.

Orbit and classification 

Ishtar orbits the Sun at a distance of 1.2–2.8 AU once every 2 years and 9 months (1,018 days; semi-major axis of 1.98 AU). Its orbit has an eccentricity of 0.39 and an inclination of 8° with respect to the ecliptic. The body's observation arc begins with its first observation at the Siding Spring Observatory in March 1981, almost 11 years prior to its official discovery observation at Palomar.

Naming 

This minor planet was named after the ancient Mesopotamian goddess Ishtar (Inanna). She is the principal goddess of the Assyrians and Babylonians associated with love, fertility, sex and war. The official  was published by the Minor Planet Center on 22 April 1997.

Physical characteristics 

Ishtar has an unknown spectral type (U). The Collaborative Asteroid Lightcurve Link (CALL) assumes standard S-type asteroid due to its relatively high albedo (see below).

Rotation period 

In December 2005, a rotational lightcurve of Ishtar was obtained from photometric observations by Vishnu Reddy and collaborators. Lightcurve analysis gave a rotation period of  hours with a brightness amplitude of 0.11 magnitude.

Diameter and albedo 

According to the survey carried out by the NEOWISE mission of NASA's Wide-field Infrared Survey Explorer, Ishtar measures 1.298 kilometers in diameter and its surface has an albedo of 0.26. The Collaborative Asteroid Lightcurve Link assumes an albedo of 0.20 and derives a diameter of 1.16 kilometers based on an absolute magnitude of 17.08.

References

External links 
 CBET 384, Central Bureau for Astronomical Telegrams – IAU, 31 January 2006
 Asteroids with Satellites, Robert Johnston, johnstonsarchive.net
 Asteroid Lightcurve Database (LCDB), query form (info )
 Dictionary of Minor Planet Names, Google books
 
 
 

007088
Discoveries by Carolyn S. Shoemaker
Discoveries by Eugene Merle Shoemaker
Named minor planets
007088
19920101
Inanna